Trevor Henry Fisher Jnr (born 8 June 1979) is a South African professional golfer who plays on the Sunshine Tour, where he is a nine-time winner.

Fisher was born in Johannesburg, South Africa but currently resides in Modderfontein, in Johannesburg. He played the South African Open in 1999 and was the low amateur. He had won more than five amateur events when he turned professional in 2002, winning his first professional title the following year on the Sunshine Tour.

In March 2015, Fisher Jnr won the Africa Open, a co-sanctioned event on the Sunshine Tour and European Tour.

Amateur highlights
1999 Modderfontein U23 (Captain)
2000 Modderfontein U23
2001 Kwazulu Natal Amateur, North West Amateur, Northern Province
2002 Champion of Champion

Professional wins (10)

European Tour wins (1)

1Co-sanctioned by the Sunshine Tour

Sunshine Tour wins (9)

1Co-sanctioned by the European Tour

Sunshine Tour playoff record (2–3)

Other wins (1)
2008 Klipdrift Premium Sun International Touring Pro-Am @ Sun City

Results in World Golf Championships

"T" = Tied

External links

South African male golfers
Sunshine Tour golfers
European Tour golfers
Golfers from Johannesburg
White South African people
1979 births
Living people